= Reservation Virodhi Dal =

Reservation Virodhi Dal (Antireservation Party) is a political party in the Indian state of Punjab. The party was floated in October 1999 by the General Category Welfare Federation of Punjab. The party is opposed to affirmative action quotas and reservations. The convenor of the party is Raghunandan Singh.
